The Football Conference season of 1993–94 was the fifteenth season of the Football Conference, also known as the GM Vauxhall Conference for sponsorship reasons.

Overview
Kidderminster Harriers finished the season as Conference champions, but were unable to gain promotion to the Football League as their stadium failed to meet capacity requirements. As a result, the bottom placed Third Division club Northampton Town avoided relegation to the Conference.

New teams in the league this season
 Halifax Town (relegated from the Football League 1992–93)
 Dover Athletic (promoted 1992–93)
 Southport (promoted 1992–93)

Final  league table

Results

Promotion and relegation

Promoted
 Farnborough Town (from the Southern Premier League)
 Stevenage Borough (from the Isthmian League)

Relegated
 Slough Town (to the Isthmian League)
 Witton Albion (to the Northern Premier League)

Top scorers in order of league goals

References

External links
 1993–94 Conference National Results

National League (English football) seasons
5